O'Malley may refer to:

 O'Malley (surname), a surname (including a list of people with the name)
 O'Malley, Australian Capital Territory, a suburb of Canberra
 , a research vessel in commission in the United States Fish and Wildlife Service from 1949 to 1951
 Ó Máille clan or Kings of Umaill, an Irish clan name anglicized as O'Malley

See also
 Malley
 Maley
 Mally (disambiguation)
 Maly (disambiguation)